Patrick Schelling (born 1 May 1990 in Hemberg) is a Swiss cyclist, who most recently rode for UCI WorldTeam .

It was revealed in September 2020 that Schelling had tested positive for use of terbutaline, an unauthorised asthma drug, on stage 2 of the Tour du Rwanda on 24 February. As a result of the 'non-intentional anti-doping rule violation,' Schelling was stripped of his results from this race, including a third place overall finish, and was handed a four-month suspension that retroactively began on 18 May 2020.

Major results

2011
 2nd  Road race, Summer Universiade
 3rd Road race, National Under–23 Road Championships
2012
 2nd Road race, National Under–23 Road Championships
2016
 1st  Overall Tour du Loir-et-Cher
1st Stage 4
 2nd Croatia–Slovenia
 3rd Overall Tour of Austria
 4th Overall Tour of Hainan
2017
 1st Stage 4 Okolo Jižních Čech
 2nd Tour du Jura
 8th Overall Flèche du Sud
 8th Overall Tour of Hainan
2018
 1st Prologue Tour de Hongrie
 1st Stage 3 (ITT) Tour de Savoie Mont Blanc
 National Road Championships
2nd Road race
5th Time trial
2019
 4th Gran Premio di Lugano
 5th Road race, National Road Championships
 9th Overall Tour of Austria
2020 
 3rd Overall Tour of Hainan
 3rd Overall Tour du Rwanda
 8th Road race, National Road Championships

References

External links

1990 births
Living people
Swiss male cyclists
People from Toggenburg
Universiade medalists in cycling
Cyclists at the 2015 European Games
European Games competitors for Switzerland
Universiade silver medalists for Switzerland
Medalists at the 2011 Summer Universiade
Sportspeople from the canton of St. Gallen
21st-century Swiss people